is a Japanese football defender who plays for Giravanz Kitakyushu.

Club career
In addition to his appearances in league matches with the Red Diamonds, he also has appeared three times in the J. League Cup.  He is a product of the Red Diamonds' youth system.

Career statistics

Club
.

International

References

Yokohama FC News

External links

Takuya Nagata at Thespa Kusatsu official site 
Takuya Nagata at Yahoo! Japan sports 

1990 births
Living people
Association football people from Saitama Prefecture
Japanese footballers
J1 League players
J2 League players
Urawa Red Diamonds players
Thespakusatsu Gunma players
Yokohama FC players
Tokyo Verdy players
Giravanz Kitakyushu players
Association football defenders